Teri Meri Love Stories is an anthology series of 90 minute telefilms promoted as a "collection of assorted love stories" which premiered on 11 August 2012 on Star Plus. The series aired on weekends and featured many actors.

Plot
A series of 16 heart-warming stories about complicated relationships revolving around love, heartbreaks, trust and betrayal.

Episodes

Storyline
 Episode 01: Twist Wala Love  Sunaina (Mala Salariya), a wedding planner and Tarun (Gautam Rode), an investment banker meet at a wedding. As they try to break the alliance, will they fall in love?
 Episode 02: A Love Triangle  Shreshth (Viraf Patel) is an ambitious man who ignores his wife Meera (Shilpa Anand). When Meera becomes friends with Keshav (Mudit Nayar), Shreshth decides to win her back.
 Episode 03: A Second Chance  Raghu (Karan Singh Grover), a divorcee fighting for his daughter's custody meets Simran (Anita Hassanandani), who is still holding on to her broken marriage. Will these two fall in love?
 Episode 04: Love Or Career?  Smitha (Chhavi Pandey) wants to become a cardiologist. Trapped between love and career, she meets Ritesh (Karan Wahi), a paediatrician. 
 Episode 05: Songs Of Love  Ishan (Avinash Sachdev) and Pari (Shafaq Naaz) are aspiring singers. Pari hides her pregnancy when Ishan refuses to marry her. What happens when they meet years later?
 Episode 06: Childhood Sweethearts  Vivan (Keith Sequeira) and Niti (Jennifer Winget) are childhood lovers. Vivan ends up being responsible for Niti’s brother's death. As they meet after a few years, will love bloom again? 
 Episode 07: Destined For Love  Kareena (Umang Jain), in order to get past her perverted boss, lies that she is engaged. She is in a mess again when he demands to see her 'fiance' (Rahul Sharma)!
 Episode 08: A Gangster's Love Story  A blind girl, Naina (Neha Janpandit) is kidnapped by a group of brash guys. What happens when the leader of the gang (Arjun Bijlani) falls in love with her?
 Episode 09: Love Comes In All Colours  Madhav (Amit Varma), a Tamilian working in a BPO meets Priya (Vandana Gupta), a Punjabi woman running a cafe. They start dating but fate has some other plans.
 Episode 10: Waiting For The Muse?  Onir (Abhay Vakil), an accomplished dramatist longs to find his inspiration, Paro. A chance glance at Pihu (Ankita Maheswari) makes him realise that this she is the girl! 
 Episode 11: Are Marriages Made In Heaven?  Saloni (Mahii Vij) believes that her ex-boyfriend still loves her, though she is married to Nityanand (Shaheer Sheikh). On their honeymoon, a truth about love and marriage unfolds.
 Episode 12: Opposites Attracts  Sia (Pooja Sharma) is a matchmaker and Karan (Karan Kundra) creates discord between couples. To teach Karan a lesson, she hires him. Will they end up in love?
 Episode 13: Trust, Love And Betrayal  Anika (Surgun Mehta) loses her memory on the eve of her wedding anniversary. As her husband (Karan Patel) has an extramarital affair, will she still accept him after learning the truth?
 Episode 14: Love Will Find It's Way  Nikita (Divyanka Tripathi) and Nikhil (Iqbal Khan) elope and get married. But split up due to some reasons. What happens when he returns after 5 years and works with her in the same office?
 Episode 15: All You Need Is Love  Jahnvi (Vandana Joshi) falls in love with Mukul (Ravi Dubey). Her brother beats Mukul up. After a few years, she joins a hotel, unaware that it is owned by Mukul!
 Episode 16: Love Beats Separation  Rohit (Karan Grover) and Anjali (Aditi Sharma) are in love, despite their family's animosity. Anjali’s father decides to send her to the US. Can Rohit bring her back?

Cast
 E01 Twist Wala Love: Mala Salariya as Sunaina, Gautam Rode as Tarun, Kushal Punjabi as Karthik and Dimple Jhangiani as Anjali
 E02 A Love Triangle: Shilpa Anand as Meera, Viraf Patel as Shreshth and Mudit Nayar as Keshav
 E03 A Second Chance: Karan Singh Grover as Raghu and Anita Hassanandani as Simran
 E04 Love Or Career?: Karan Wahi as Ritesh and Chhavi Pandey as Smitha
 E05 Songs Of Love: Avinash Sachdev as Ishan and Shafaq Naaz as Pari
 E06 Childhood Sweethearts: Jennifer Winget Niti, Keith Sequeira as Vivan and Akanksha Kapil as Vivan's wife
 E07 Destined For Love: Umang Jain as Kareena and  Rahul Sharma as Aryan
 E08 A Gangster's Love Story: Arjun Bijlani as Raghu and  Neha Janpandit as Naina
 E09 Love Comes In All Colours: Amit Varma as Madhav and Vandana Gupta as Priya
 E10 Waiting For The Muse?: Abhay Vakil as Onir and Ankita Maheswari as Pihu/Roopali
 E11 Are Marriages Made In Heaven?: Mahii Vij as Saloni and Shaheer Sheikh as Nityanand
 E12 Opposites Attracts: Karan Kundra as Karan and Pooja Sharma as Sia
 E13 Trust, Love And Betrayal: Karan Patel as Yug Saxena and Sargun Mehta as Anika
 E14 Love Will Find Its Way: Iqbal Khan as Nikhil and Divyanka Tripathi Dahiya as Nikita
 E15 All You Need Is Love: Ravi Dubey as Mukul and Vandana Joshi as Jahnvi 
 E16 Love Beats Separation: Karan Grover as Rohit and Aditi Sharma as Anjali

Guest Appearances

References

External links
 
Teri Meri Love Stories on Hotstar

Indian television series
StarPlus original programming
2012 Indian television series debuts
2012 Indian television series endings
Indian anthology television series
Indian romance television series